Kalev Kesküla (22 October 1959 – 25 June 2010) was an Estonian journalist and writer.

Kesküla was born in Tallinn. In 1983, he graduated from the University of Tartu in Estonian philology.

From 1983 to 1991, he worked as an editor for Estonian Encyclopaedia Publishers. 
Since 1991, he was an editor and columnist for the newspaper Eesti Ekspress and its culture supplement Areen.

He was also an expert on wine topic. He wrote the first lexicon of wine in Estonian language.

Works
 1986: poetry collection "Läbi linnaöö" ('Through the City Night')
 1998: poetry collection "Vabariigi laulud" ('Songs of the Republic')
 2010: prose collection "Elu sumedusest" ('A Life of Tenderness')

References

1959 births
2010 deaths
Estonian journalists
Estonian male poets
Estonian editors
University of Tartu alumni
Writers from Tallinn